Sir Reginald Richard Sholl (8 October 19027 August 1988) was an Australian lawyer, judge, diplomat, commentator.

Having attended Melbourne Grammar School and the University of Melbourne, Sholl was selected as Victorian Rhodes scholar for 1924. Whilst studying at Oxford University he lived at New College, and learnt to play rugby.

In 1950 Sholl was appointed a judge in the Supreme Court of Victoria. In 1952, he suggested it would be appropriate to order corporal punishment for violent crimes.

In 1966, Sholl picked up an overseas posting, serving the Australian Government as Australian Consul-General in New York.

In 1970, Sholl joined the committee of the Overseas Services Bureau. The Bureau was responsible for the Australian Volunteers Abroad scheme.

In 1974 and 1975 Sholl conducted a Royal Commission into airline services to Western Australia.

References

1902 births
1988 deaths
Consuls-General of Australia in New York
Australian Knights Bachelor
People educated at Trinity College (University of Melbourne)
University of Melbourne alumni
Australian Rhodes Scholars
People from East Melbourne
Lawyers from Melbourne
People educated at Melbourne Grammar School